Anything Is Possible is the third studio album by American singer-songwriter Debbie Gibson, released on November 20, 1990 by Atlantic Records. The album features a collaboration between Gibson and veteran Motown songwriter Lamont Dozier, who co-wrote four of the album's tracks including the title single. "Stand Your Ground" marked Gibson's final collaboration with longtime producer Fred Zarr.

At the time of the album's release in late 1990, Gibson was 20 years old and the late-1980s teen pop wave was near its end. The album was Gibson's first to not reach the Top 10 on the Billboard 200 Albums chart, peaking at No. 41 in the United States. It made the top 40 of the Cashbox albums chart for one week, peaking at No. 38 on December 22, 1990 before descending down the chart. The album sold fewer copies than her previous two albums, Out of the Blue and Electric Youth, both of which had gone multi-platinum.

Anything Is Possible was certified Gold by the RIAA. In Japan, the album reached No. 5 on the Oricon weekly albums chart and was certified Gold by the RIAJ. The album was released in March 1991 in the United Kingdom but stalled at No. 69. The title single reached the top 30 of the Billboard Hot 100 chart.

The album was included in the 2017 box set We Could Be Together, with two B-sides as bonus tracks. A special two-disc digipack edition was released by Cherry Red Records on March 18, 2022.

Track listing
The LP and cassette releases have unique labels on their sides. Side A is labeled "NRG↑" (pronounced "energy up") for its upbeat songs while the ballad-oriented side B is "Mood Swings".

All tracks are written and produced by Deborah Gibson, except where indicated.

∗ denotes track featured only on CD and cassette formats.

Charts

1990 Charts

Deluxe Edition

Certifications and sales

Personnel
Adapted credits from the liner notes of Anything Is Possible.

Musicians
Debbie Gibson - lead vocals, backing vocals, keyboard programming, drum programming, piano
Lamont Dozier - keyboard programming, drum programming, rhythm track arrangement, backing vocals (tracks 2–3, 7)
Hense Powell - keyboard programming, keyboards (tracks 2, 7)
Andrew Zulla - keyboard programming, drum programming (track 3)
Fred Zarr - keyboard programming, drum programming (track 5)
John "Jellybean" Benitez - drum programming (track 4)
Ed Terry - synthesizers (track 4)
Gary Corbett - keyboards, Hammond B-3 (track 8, 13, 16)
Paul Buckmaster - string arrangement, horns arrangement (tracks 3, 9-10, 14-15)
Jerry Hey - horn arrangement (tracks 7, 10)
Carlos Alomar - guitar, acoustic guitar, electric guitar, synth guitar (tracks 1–2, 7–8, 10, 15-16)
Ira Siegel - guitar, electric guitar, acoustic guitar (tracks 3, 5, 7, 12-14)
Paul Pesco - guitar (tracks 4, 6)
Eluriel "Tinker" Barfield - bass (track 6)
Freddie Washington - bass (track 7)
Doug Stegmeyer - bass (tracks 8, 10, 13, -15-16)
Margaret Ross - harp (track 16)
Fred Levine - drums, drum overdubs (tracks 1, 3, 8, 10, 12–13, 15-16)
Quentin Dennard - drums (track 7)
Bashiri Johnson - percussion (tracks 1–5, 7, 10, 12-15)
Adam Tese - saxophone, percussion (tracks 6, 10)
Jocelyn Brown - backing vocals (track 1)
Connie Harvey - backing vocals (track 1)
Michelle Cobbs - backing vocals (tracks 3, 16)
B.J. Nelson - backing vocals (tracks 3, 6, 8)
Keeth Stewart - backing vocals (tracks 3, 8, 15)
Carrie Johnson - backing vocals (tracks 4, 8, 13)
Libby Johnson - backing vocals (tracks 4, 8, 13)
Robin Clark - backing vocals (tracks 5–8, 10, 16)
Fonzi Thornton - backing vocals (tracks 5–8, 10, 16)
Freddie Jackson - backing vocals (track 12)
Yolanda Lee - backing vocals (track 12)
Jesi Forte - backing vocals (track 15)
Dennis Collins - backing vocals (track 16)

Production
Debbie Gibson - arranger (tracks 1–3, 6, 8-16)
Lamont Dozier - arranger (tracks 2, 7)
Hense Powell - arranger (track 3, 7)
Jellybean Benitez - arranger (track 4)
Ed Terry - arranger (track 4)
Fred Zarr - arranger (track 5)
Phil Castellano - recording engineer, mix engineer (tracks 1-10, 12-16)
Andrew Zulla - recording engineer, programming engineer, assistant recording engineer (tracks 1, 3–4, 6, 8-12, 16)
Reggie Dozier - recording engineer (track 2, 7)
Phil Esses - recording engineer (track 5)
Bob Rosa - mix engineer (tracks 1–3, 7, 9, 11–12, 14, 16)
Hugo Dwyer - mix engineer (tracks 4, 6, 10)
Dave Sorenson - assistant mix engineer (tracks 1–3, 7, 9, 11–12, 14, 16)
Andy Grassi - assistant mix engineer (tracks 5, 8, 13, 15)
Jay Ryan - assistant mix engineer (tracks 6, 10)
John Karlquist - album coordinator
Diane Gibson - executive producer, management
Alberto Tolot - photography
Paul Starr - makeup (Profile, Los Angeles)
Victor Vidal - hair (Cloutier, Los Angeles)
Derric Lowe - stylist
Ted Jensen - mastering (Sterling Sound, NYC)

References

External links
 
 
 

1990 albums
Debbie Gibson albums
Albums arranged by Paul Buckmaster
Albums produced by Lamont Dozier
Atlantic Records albums
Bubblegum pop albums